Tomás José Ramón del Carmen de Herrera y Pérez Dávila (21 December 1804 – 5 December 1854) was a Neogranadine statesman and general who in 1840 became Head of State of the Free State of the Isthmus, a short lived independent state which is located in what is now Panama. Tomás de Herrera also became President of the Republic of the New Granada in 1854 during the rebellion against the incumbent president José María Melo. 
Herrera was born on December 21, 1804. He entered military service in 1822 and became a lieutenant. He participated in the battles of Junín and Ayacucho against the royalists in Peru. In 1828 he was charged with conspiracy, and jailed in Bogota. Herrera escaped, was recaptured and sentenced to death, but his sentence was commuted to banishment. Upon completion of sentence, he returned to Panama in 1830 and participated in the fight against Colonel Juan Eligio Alzuru. When Alzuru was shot, Herrera was appointed Colonel Commandant General of the Isthmus of Panama.
He fought in the Cauca revolution in 1840 but the isthmus population  did not want to join that conflict. A popular meeting in Panama on Nov. 18, 1840 voted for the separation of Panama from Colombia, under the name of the State of the Isthmus with Colonel Herrera as president. He then organized the economy and obtained that Costa Rica and the United States would recognize the new country. The State of the isthmus lasted only 13 months. An agreement to which Herrera opposed reconvened the union between Panama and Colombia, which lasted until 1903.

Governor of Panama
In 1845, Herrera returned to national political life as governor of Panama and later minister of War and Navy of the government of José Hilario López. In 1850, he was appointed governor of the province of Cartagena and that same year he received the grade of general. In 1851 a revolution erupted in the provinces against the conservative government of President José Hilario López, whereupon the government appointed military commanders to quell the insurgency. Herrera had to confront the governor of Antioquia, Col. Eusebio Borrero, who was defeated and considered General Herrera as a military genius.

Rise to power
Herrera was appointed by the presidency of Colombia in 1854 when he was a member of Congress. President José María Obando was ousted by a military coup on April 17 of that year. Vice President José de Obaldía met with Herrera and other characters in the Legation of the United States to try to assume power, offering Herrera the secretariat of war, nomination that the general refused because it deprived him of his congress seat. Days later, Herrera managed to evade military custody that the dictator Melo had established in Bogota. On April 21, he arrived to Chocontá, where he declared himself exercising the executive power as a result of a letter of Obaldía stating that he was not able to form a government.

Tasks of government
Herrera appointed Colonel Anselmo Pineda as Secretary of State responsible for Finances, war and foreign relations. Herrera continued his march and entered on April 23 to Tunja, thanks to Colonel Reyes Patria won the national guard ensconced in the city, where he appointed General Manuel Maria Franco as commander of the army and Reyes Patria commander of the provinces of Tunja and Tundama.
Franco managed to build an army of 2557 men, which was the second commander Gen. Marcelo Buitrago and chief of staff Colonel Jose Maria Rojas Pinzón. Herrera came out with his army of Tunja to Nemocón, population they arrived on May 19, and which should take one of two decisions: attacking the column of Colonel Manuel Jimenez Stake Zipaquirá, or continue the march up to join Honda to the forces commanded by General Joaquín París Ricaurte.

Herrera took the decision to attack Jimenez, on May 20, 1854 and the resulting Battle of Zipaquirá was a disaster, where the constitutional forces were defeated necessarily. On the death of Franco, Herrera gave him the command of Army.  Gen. Marcelo Buitrago, who has returned to the starting point of the battle, sought the departure of the troops to Tunja, while Herrera had taken the opposite direction, to continue with the plan original.

With the support of the  army Arboleda, Herrera rebuild the government appointing Ramon Mateus as secretary of war and foreign affairs, and Pastor Ospina Rodriguez as secretary of the interior and finance. They departed with a bataillon to join Paris but not succeeded, then sought to reach Ambalema by San Juan de Rioseco.

At the port, Herrera named Tomás Cipriano de Mosquera as commander of Mompós, Panama and Costa and sent instructions to the governors. Then he left for El Guamo where he was joined by Gen. Lopez and the governor of Cauca. Herrera was finally able to get to Ibague and install the executive branch, where he issued decrees which called on lawmakers to start meetings on July 20 in Bogota.

On July 15, Herrera rebuild his cabinet, leaving Pastor Ospina in government, Jose Maria Soto Plata in Treasure, Ramon Mateus in Foreign Affairs and Pedro Alcantara Herran at war. On July 20 were 23 congressmen in Ibague, which did not allow Congress to sit for lack of quorum.

Return to the ranks and death
On August 5 José de Obaldía assumed executive authority, appointing Herrera second in command of the army in the North. On September 28 Piedecuesta was in command of his troops when he received the visit of General Mosquera, commander in chief of the army. On Sept. 25 they succeeded in crossing the river Chicamocha . On December 2 they reached the outskirts of Bogota with the column commanded by General Camilo Mendoza. On December 4, 1854 after the attack deployed by the army on the southern side of the city of Bogota, Herrera went into action in command of two battalions but he was seriously injured in the corner of the races Pamplona and Bárbula, and died shortly after.

External links
 Biography at the site of the Luis Angel Arango Library, [1]
 Life of General Tomas Herrera - Ricardo J. Alfaro (1999).

1804 births
Colombian military personnel killed in action
1859 deaths
Presidents of Colombia
Presidents of Panama
Presidential Designates of Colombia
Colombian generals
Colombian Liberal Party politicians
Panamanian independence activists